James Grant (1822–1887) was a Scottish novelist and miscellaneous writer.

Grant was born in Edinburgh, Scotland, and was a distant relation of Sir Walter Scott. He was a prolific author, writing some 90 books, including many yellow-backs. Titles included Adventures of an Aide-de-camp, One of "The six hundred", The Scottish musketeers and The Scottish cavalier.

Many of his 56 novels are about important characters and events in Scottish history. In 1853 he founded the National Association for the Vindication of Scottish Rights. Grant is known for his six-volume Old And New Edinburgh, published in 1880 by Cassell.

Biography
Grant was born at Edinburgh 1 August 1822. He was eldest son of John Grant and grandson of James Grant of Corrimony (1743?–1835) advocate. From his grandfather, James Grant, the novelist inherited strong Jacobite proclivities, and he was connected by descent with the Veitches of Dawyck, Peeblesshire, and thus possessed a strain of border blood. His mother, who died when he was a child, belonged to the Watson family of Overmains, not unknown in the artistic annals of Scotland, and through her he was intimately related to Sir Walter Scott, the Swintons of Swinton, and other eminent families.

The father, Captain John Grant, of the 92nd Gordon Highlanders, had served with distinction throughout the Peninsular war. After his wife's death Captain Grant obtained a command in Newfoundland, whither he sailed in 1833, taking with him his three sons. After spending six years in American barracks Grant returned home with his father, who had resigned his command, in 1839.

A year later (in 1840), through the influence of Lord Hill, under whom Captain John Grant had served in Spain, Grant was gazetted to an ensigncy in the 62nd Foot, and joined the provisional battalion at Chatham. He was soon appointed to command the depot, but in 1843 resigned his commission and entered the office of Mr. Rhind, architect, Edinburgh.

Grant became a skilled draughtsman, but other and literary tastes were showing themselves, and he now devoted himself to novel writing, speedily becoming a most prolific writer. His first novel, and in some respects his best, The Romance of War, appeared in 1845. It owed its birth to the many anecdotes of Spain and the French war, which had been related to him by his father, and described the adventures of the Gordon highlanders in the Peninsula. The vivid description of battles speedily procured for it an enormous sale; but it only produced £20 for its author. A sequel entitled The Highlanders in Belgium soon followed. Then came The Adventures of an Aide-de-Camp, of which the popularity equalled that of his first novel. The Yellow Frigate, Bothwell, Jane Seton, and many more succeeded, and from that time to his death never a year passed without one, often two, and even three novels being produced. His last works of fiction were 'Love's Labour Won' (1888), dealing with incidents of Burmese dacoity, and Playing with Fire (1887), a story of the war in the Soudan.

He wrote in all some fifty-six novels. A quick succession of incidents, much vivacity of style, and a dialogue that seldom flags characterise all of them. Those dealing with Scottish history embody considerable research, are vigorous and picturesque in style, and express much sympathy with the reckless daring, loyalty, and manliness of Scotch and border heroes.

A charge of plagiarism has been brought against Grant owing to his having incorporated without acknowledgment a good many descriptive passages from a book of travels and campaigning in one of his novels. Grant, however, does not seem to have exceeded the license justly allowed a novelist of appropriating local colour for his fictions from graver writers .

Grant wrote much and well on history, especially the history of his native land. The following are his works in this department of literature:
 Memoirs and Adventures of Sir W. Kirkaldy of Grange, 1849.
 Memorials of the Castle of Edinburgh, 1850. 
 Memoirs and Adventures of Sir J. Hepburn, 1851. 
 Memoirs of Montrose, 1858. 
 The Cavaliers of Fortune, or British Heroes in Foreign Wars, 1859; reissued with title reversed, 1873. 
 British Battles on Land and Sea, 1873; followed in 1884 by Recent British Battles on Land and Sea.' 
 Illustrated History of India, 1876.
 Old and New Edinburgh, 1880; 
 History of the War in the Soudan, 1885–6. 
 The Tartans of the Clans of Scotland, 1886. 
 Scottish Soldiers of Fortune, 1889 (posthumous).

In 1852 Grant founded and acted as secretary to the National Association for the Vindication of Scottish Rights, upholding its views steadily in spite of the ridicule heaped upon him by Punch and many English newspapers. He was an energetic supporter of the volunteer movement, and one of the first to join its ranks.

As an authority on military matters he was frequently consulted by the war office, and was examined as a witness in connection with the present territorial system, and many of his suggestions, such as the present facings of the British army, were adopted. The plans for the proposed alterations in Edinburgh Castle were also submitted to him.

Grant married the eldest daughter of James Browne, LL.D.. and had two sons: James, who died before his father, and Roderick, a Roman Catholic priest. He had himself embraced the Roman Catholic faith in 1875. He died 5 May 1887 in London, at the age of sixty-five. His popularity had decayed before his death. He was modest and retiring, genial, intensely patriotic, and of strong religious susceptibilities; but with all his devotion to literature he died leaving only £490.

Partial bibliographyAdventures of an Aide-de-CampAdventures of Rob RoyArthur BlaneBothwellDick RodneyFirst Love and Last LoveHarry OgilvieJack ManlyJane SetonLady Wedderburn's WishLaura EveringhamLegends of the Black WatchLetty Hyde's LoversMary of LorraineOliver EllisOnly an EnsignPhilip RolloThe Cavaliers of FortuneThe Constable of FranceThe Girl He MarriedThe King's Own BordersThe Phantom RegimentThe Queen's CadetThe Romance of WarThe White CockadeThe Yellow FrigateUnder the Red DragonNotes

References
 (published as a periodical): Online edition

Attribution
  Endnotes:
Grant's Works; Times, 7 May 1887;
Scottish News, do.;
Athenæum, 14 May 1887;
Academy, do.;
 Scottish Review, art. Grant's Scottish Historical Novels'', by S. F. F. Veitch, January 1888;
private information from Mr. F. J. Grant, Carrick Pursuivant;
Saturday Review, 14 May 1887; Daily News, 7 May 1887.

Further reading

External links
 
 
 

 

1822 births
1887 deaths
Writers from Edinburgh
19th-century Scottish historians
19th-century Scottish novelists
Burials at St Mary's Catholic Cemetery, Kensal Green